The orange-breasted thornbird (Phacellodomus ferrugineigula), also known as the red-eyed thornbird, is a species of bird in the family Furnariidae. It is found in forest and woodland, especially near water, in southeastern Brazil and adjacent northern Uruguay.

It was formerly considered a subspecies of P. erythropthalmus, but under the common name red-eyed thornbird. When split, P. erythropthalmus is known as the orange-eyed thornbird. Unlike that species, the orange-breasted thornbird has dark reddish-brown eyes, extensive rufous to the underparts, a relatively large rufous crown-patch, and dark central rectrices (which contrast with the rufous outer rectrices). The two also have different voices and are locally sympatric in São Paulo without evidence of interbreeding.

References

External links

orange-breasted thornbird
Birds of the Atlantic Forest
Birds of the South Region
orange-breasted thornbird
Taxonomy articles created by Polbot